Magdalena Schmidt (later Magdalena Jakob, born 30 June 1949) is a retired German gymnast. She competed at the 1968 Summer Olympics in all artistic gymnastics events and won a bronze medal in the team competition. Her best individual result was seventh place in the vault.

References

1949 births
Living people
People from Lauchhammer
Gymnasts at the 1968 Summer Olympics
German female artistic gymnasts
Sportspeople from Brandenburg
Olympic medalists in gymnastics
Olympic gymnasts of East Germany
Medalists at the 1968 Summer Olympics
Olympic bronze medalists for East Germany